Humboldt Municipal Airport  is a public-use airport located in Gibson County, Tennessee, United States. It is three nautical miles (6 km) southeast of the central business district of the City of Humboldt, which owns the airport. According to the FAA's National Plan of Integrated Airport Systems for 2009–2013, it was classified as a general aviation airport.

Facilities and aircraft 
It has one runway designated 4/22 with an asphalt surface measuring 4,003 by 75 feet (1,220 x 23 m).

For the 12-month period ending November 23, 1999, the airport had 10,222 aircraft operations, an average of 28 per day: 98.5% general aviation, 1% air taxi, and 0.5% military. At that time there were 19 aircraft based at this airport: 89.5% single-engine and 10.5% multi-engine.

References

External links 
 Aerial photo as of 1 February 1997 from USGS The National Map
 
 

Airports in Tennessee
Buildings and structures in Gibson County, Tennessee
Transportation in Gibson County, Tennessee